Clementine Stoney (born 22 October 1981) is an Australian former competitive swimmer and former world record-holder.  She represented Australia at the 2000 Summer Olympics in Sydney.  There she finished in thirteenth position in the 200-metre backstroke.  Stoney won the silver medal in the 200-metre backstroke at the 2000 FINA Short Course World Championships in Athens, Greece.

She was an Australian Institute of Sport scholarship holder. Because of an illness Stoney had to quit her swimming career in 2003.

See also
 World record progression 200 metres backstroke

References

1981 births
Living people
Sportspeople from Albury
Australian female backstroke swimmers
Olympic swimmers of Australia
Swimmers at the 2000 Summer Olympics
Australian Institute of Sport swimmers
Medalists at the FINA World Swimming Championships (25 m)
Sportswomen from New South Wales
20th-century Australian women
21st-century Australian women